Donald Thomas Caley (October 9, 1945 – January 16, 2016) was a Canadian professional ice hockey goaltender.

Playing career
Caley played junior hockey in the Saskatchewan Junior Hockey League for the Weyburn Red Wings for three seasons as well as one game in the Ontario Hockey Association's Junior A division with the Peterborough Petes. On June 6, 1967, Caley was claimed in the 1967 NHL Expansion Draft by the St. Louis Blues and played one game during the 1967-68 NHL season. He was traded to the New York Rangers during the off-season but never played for them, instead suiting up for the Omaha Knights as well as one game for the Buffalo Bisons.

On July 3, 1969, Caley was traded to the Western Hockey League's Phoenix Roadrunners where he became their starting goalie.  In February 1970, Caley suffered severe whiplash in a car accident and missed the remainder of the season though he recovered in time for the next season.  He retired after the 1972-73 season to become a dentist but returned the next season, feeling he could do both jobs at once, but retired for good after just seven games and spent the remainder of his life in sales.

Caley died in Phoenix, Arizona in 2016.

See also
 List of players who played only one game in the NHL

References

External links
 

1945 births
2016 deaths
Buffalo Bisons (AHL) players
Canadian ice hockey goaltenders
Ice hockey people from Manitoba
Kansas City Blues players
Omaha Knights (CHL) players
Peterborough Petes (ice hockey) players
Phoenix Roadrunners (WHL) players
Pittsburgh Hornets players
St. Louis Blues players
Sportspeople from Dauphin, Manitoba
Weyburn Red Wings players
Canadian expatriate ice hockey players in the United States